Ufer is a surname. Notable people with the surname include:

Bob Ufer (1920–1981), American track and field athlete and radio broadcaster
Nils Ufer (1939–1993), Danish journalist and editor
Walter Ufer (1876–1936), American painter

See also
Ufer ground